The , abbreviated Gestapo, was the official secret police of Nazi Germany and in German-occupied Europe.

The force was created by Hermann Göring in 1933 by combining the various political police agencies of Prussia into one organisation. On 20 April 1934, oversight of the Gestapo passed to the head of the Schutzstaffel (SS), Heinrich Himmler, who was also appointed Chief of German Police by Hitler in 1936. From 27 September 1939, it was administered by the Reich Security Main Office (RSHA). During World War II, the Gestapo played a key role in the Holocaust. After the war ended, the Gestapo was declared a criminal organisation by the International Military Tribunal (IMT) at the Nuremberg trials.

History
After Adolf Hitler became Chancellor of Germany, Hermann Göring—future commander of the Luftwaffe and the number two man in the Nazi Party—was named Interior Minister of Prussia. This gave Göring command of the largest police force in Germany. Soon afterward, Göring detached the political and intelligence sections from the police and filled their ranks with Nazis. He originally wanted to name it the Secret Police Office, but the German initials, "GPA", were too similar to those of the Soviet State Political Directorate (or GPU).

The first commander of the Gestapo was Rudolf Diels, a protégé of Göring. Diels was best known as the primary interrogator of Marinus van der Lubbe after the Reichstag fire. In late 1933, the Reich Interior Minister Wilhelm Frick wanted to integrate all the police forces of the German states under his control. Göring outflanked him by removing the Prussian political and intelligence departments from the state interior ministry. Göring took over the Gestapo in 1934 and urged Hitler to extend the agency's authority throughout Germany. Frick did not have the political power to take on Göring by himself so he allied with Himmler. With Frick's support, Himmler (pushed on by his right-hand man, Reinhard Heydrich) took over the political police in state-after-state. Soon only Prussia was left.

Also on that date, Hitler appointed Himmler chief of all German police outside Prussia. Heydrich, named chief of the Gestapo by Himmler on 22 April 1934, also continued as head of the SS Security Service (SD). Himmler and Heydrich both immediately began installing their own personnel in select positions, several of whom were directly from the Bavarian Political Police, such as Heinrich Müller, Franz Josef Huber and Josef Meisinger. Many of the Gestapo employees in the newly established offices were young and highly educated in a wide variety of academic fields and moreover, represented a new generation of National Socialist adherents, who were hard-working, efficient, and prepared to carry the Nazi state forward through the persecution of their political opponents.

By the spring of 1934, Himmler's SS controlled the SD and the Gestapo, but for him, there was still a problem, as technically the SS (and the Gestapo by proxy) was subordinated to the SA, which was under the command of Ernst Röhm. Himmler wanted to free himself entirely from Röhm, whom he viewed as an obstacle. Röhm's position was menacing as more than 4.5 million men fell under his command once the militias and veterans organisations were absorbed by the SA, a fact which fuelled Röhm's aspirations; his dream of fusing the SA and Reichswehr together was undermining Hitler's relationships with the leadership of Germany's armed forces. Several Nazi chieftains, among them Göring, Joseph Goebbels, Rudolf Hess, and Himmler, began a concerted campaign to convince Hitler to take action against Röhm. Both the SD and Gestapo released information concerning an imminent putsch by the SA. Once persuaded, Hitler acted by setting Himmler's SS into action, who then proceeded to murder over 100 of Hitler's identified antagonists. The Gestapo supplied the information which implicated the SA and ultimately enabled Himmler and Heydrich to emancipate themselves entirely from the organisation. For the Gestapo, the next two years following the Night of the Long Knives, a term describing the putsch against Röhm and the SA, were characterised by "behind-the-scenes political wrangling over policing".

On 17 June 1936, Hitler decreed the unification of all police forces in Germany and named Himmler as Chief of German Police. This action effectively merged the police into the SS and removed it from Frick's control. This move also gave Himmler operational control over Germany's entire detective force. The Gestapo became a national state agency. Himmler also gained authority over all of Germany's uniformed law enforcement agencies, which were amalgamated into the new  (Orpo; Order Police), which became a national agency under SS general Kurt Daluege. Heinrich Müller was at that time the Gestapo operations chief. He answered to Heydrich, Heydrich answered only to Himmler, and Himmler answered only to Hitler.

The Gestapo had the authority to investigate cases of treason, espionage, sabotage and criminal attacks on the Nazi Party and Germany. The basic Gestapo law passed by the government in 1936 gave the Gestapo  to operate without judicial review—in effect, putting it above the law. The Gestapo was specifically exempted from responsibility to administrative courts, where citizens normally could sue the state to conform to laws. As early as 1935, a Prussian administrative court had ruled that the Gestapo's actions were not subject to judicial review. The SS officer Werner Best, one-time head of legal affairs in the Gestapo, summed up this policy by saying, "As long as the police carries out the will of the leadership, it is acting legally".

On 27 September 1939, the security and police agencies of Nazi Germany—with the exception of the Order Police—were consolidated into the Reich Security Main Office (RSHA), headed by Heydrich.  The Gestapo became  (Department IV) of RSHA and Müller became the Gestapo Chief, with Heydrich as his immediate superior. After Heydrich's 1942 assassination, Himmler assumed the leadership of the RSHA until January 1943, when Ernst Kaltenbrunner was appointed chief. Müller remained the Gestapo Chief. His direct subordinate Adolf Eichmann headed the Gestapo's Office of Resettlement and then its Office of Jewish Affairs ( or Sub-Department IV, Section B4). During the Holocaust, Eichmann's department within the Gestapo coordinated the mass deportation of European Jews to the Nazis' extermination camps.

The power of the Gestapo included the use of what was called, —"protective custody", a euphemism for the power to imprison people without judicial proceedings. An oddity of the system was that the prisoner had to sign his own , an order declaring that the person had requested imprisonment—presumably out of fear of personal harm. In addition, political prisoners throughout Germany—and from 1941, throughout the occupied territories under the Night and Fog Decree—simply disappeared while in Gestapo custody. Up to 30 April 1944, at least 6,639 persons were arrested under  orders. However, the total number of people who disappeared as a result of this decree is not known.

Counterintelligence
The Polish government in exile in London during World War II received sensitive military information about Nazi Germany from agents and informants throughout Europe. After Germany conquered Poland (in the autumn of 1939), Gestapo officials believed that they had neutralised Polish intelligence activities. However, certain Polish information about the movement of German police and SS units to the East during 1941 German invasion of the Soviet Union was similar to information British intelligence secretly obtained through intercepting and decoding German police and SS messages sent by radio telegraphy.

In 1942, the Gestapo discovered a cache of Polish intelligence documents in Prague and were surprised to see that Polish agents and informants had been gathering detailed military information and smuggling it out to London, via Budapest and Istanbul. The Poles identified and tracked German military trains to the Eastern front and identified four Order Police battalions sent to occupied areas of the Soviet Union in October 1941 that engaged in war crimes and mass murder.

Polish agents also gathered detailed information about the morale of German soldiers in the East. After uncovering a sample of the information the Poles had reported, Gestapo officials concluded that Polish intelligence activity represented a very serious danger to Germany. As late as 6 June 1944, Heinrich Müller—concerned about the leakage of information to the Allies—set up a special unit called  that was meant to root out the Polish intelligence network in western and southwestern Europe.

In Austria, there were groups still loyal to the Habsburgs, who unlike most across the Greater German Reich, remained determined to resist the Nazis. These groups became a special focus of the Gestapo because of their insurrectionist goals—the overthrow of the Nazi regime, the re-establishment of an independent Austria under Habsburg leadership—and Hitler's hatred of the Habsburg family. Hitler vehemently rejected the centuries' old Habsburg pluralist principles of "live and let live" with regard to ethnic groups, peoples, minorities, religions, cultures and languages. Habsburg loyalist Karl Burian's (who was later executed) plan to blow up the Gestapo headquarters in Vienna represented a unique attempt to act aggressively against the Gestapo. Burian's group had also set up a secret courier service to Otto von Habsburg in Belgium. Individuals in Austrian resistance groups led by Heinrich Maier also managed to pass along the plans and the location of production facilities for V-1, V-2 rockets, Tiger tanks, and aircraft (Messerschmitt Bf 109, Messerschmitt Me 163 Komet, etc.) to the Allies. The Maier group informed very early about the mass murder of Jews. The resistance group, later discovered by the Gestapo because of a double agent of the Abwehr, was in contact with Allen Dulles, the head of the US Office of Strategic Services in Switzerland. Although Maier and the other group members were severely tortured, the Gestapo did not uncover the essential involvement of the resistance group in Operation Crossbow and Operation Hydra.

Suppression of resistance and persecution
Early in the regime's existence, harsh measures were meted out to political opponents and those who resisted Nazi doctrine, such as members of the Communist Party of Germany (KPD); a role originally performed by the SA until the SD and Gestapo undermined their influence and took control of Reich security. Because the Gestapo seemed omniscient and omnipotent, the atmosphere of fear they created led to an overestimation of their reach and strength; a faulty assessment which hampered the operational effectiveness of underground resistance organisations.

Trade unions
Shortly after the Nazis came to power, they decided to dissolve the 28 federations of the General German Trade Union Confederation, because Hitler—after noting their success in the works council elections—intended to consolidate all German workers under the Nazi government's administration, a decision he made on 7 April 1933. As a preface to this action, Hitler decreed May 1 as National Labor Day to celebrate German workers, a move the trade union leaders welcomed. With their trade union flags waving, Hitler gave a rousing speech to the 1.5 million people assembled on Berlin's  that was nationally broadcast, during which he extolled the nation's revival and working class solidarity. On the following day, the newly formed Gestapo officers, who had been shadowing some 58 trade union leaders, arrested them wherever they could find them—many in their homes. Meanwhile, the SA and police occupied trade union headquarters, arrested functionaries, confiscated their property and assets; all by design so as to be replaced on 12 May by the German Labour Front (DAF), a Nazi organisation placed under the leadership of Robert Ley. For their part, this was the first time the Gestapo operated under its new name since its 26 April 1933 founding in Prussia.

Religious dissent
Many parts of Germany (where religious dissent existed upon the Nazi seizure of power) saw a rapid transformation; a change as noted by the Gestapo in conservative towns such as Würzburg, where people acquiesced to the regime either through accommodation, collaboration, or simple compliance. Increasing religious objections to Nazi policies led the Gestapo to carefully monitor church organisations. For the most part, members of the church did not offer political resistance but simply wanted to ensure that organizational doctrine remained intact.

However, the Nazi regime sought to suppress any source of ideology other than its own, and set out to muzzle or crush the churches in the so-called . When Church leaders (clergy) voiced their misgiving about the euthanasia program and Nazi racial policies, Hitler intimated that he considered them "traitors to the people" and went so far as to call them "the destroyers of Germany". The extreme anti-semitism and neo-pagan heresies of the Nazis caused some Christians to outright resist, and Pope Pius XI to issue the encyclical Mit Brennender Sorge denouncing Nazism and warning Catholics against joining or supporting the Party. Some pastors, like the Protestant clergyman Dietrich Bonhoeffer, paid for their opposition with their lives.

In an effort to counter the strength and influence of spiritual resistance, Nazi records reveal that the Gestapo's  monitored the activities of bishops very closely—instructing that agents be set up in every diocese, that the bishops' reports to the Vatican should be obtained and that the bishops' areas of activity must be found out. Deans were to be targeted as the "eyes and ears of the bishops" and a "vast network" established to monitor the activities of ordinary clergy: "The importance of this enemy is such that inspectors of security police and of the security service will make this group of people and the questions discussed by them their special concern".

In Dachau: The Official History 1933–1945, Paul Berben wrote that clergy were watched closely, and frequently denounced, arrested and sent to Nazi concentration camps: "One priest was imprisoned in Dachau for having stated that there were good folk in England too; another suffered the same fate for warning a girl who wanted to marry an S.S. man after abjuring the Catholic faith; yet another because he conducted a service for a deceased communist". Others were arrested simply on the basis of being "suspected of activities hostile to the State" or that there was reason to "suppose that his dealings might harm society". Over 2,700 Catholic, Protestant, and Orthodox clergy were imprisoned at Dachau alone. After Heydrich (who was staunchly anti-Catholic and anti-Christian) was assassinated in Prague, his successor, Ernst Kaltenbrunner, relaxed some of the policies and then disbanded Department IVB (religious opponents) of the Gestapo.

Homosexuality
Violence and arrest were not confined to that opposing political parties, membership in trade unions, or those with dissenting religious opinions, but also homosexuality. It was viewed negatively by Hitler. From the Nazis rise to national power in 1933, the number of court verdicts against homosexuals steadily increased and only declined once the Second World War started. In 1934, a special Gestapo office was set up in Berlin to deal with homosexuality.

Despite male homosexuality being considered a greater danger to "national survival", lesbianism was likewise viewed as unacceptable—deemed gender nonconformity—and a number of individual reports on lesbians can be found in Gestapo files. Between 1933 and 1935, some 4,000 men were arrested; between 1936 and 1939, another 30,000 men were convicted. If homosexuals showed any signs of sympathy to the Nazis' identified racial enemies, they were considered an even greater danger. According to Gestapo case files, the majority of those arrested for homosexuality were males between eighteen and twenty-five years of age.

Student opposition
Between June 1942 and March 1943, student protests were calling for an end to the Nazi regime. These included the non-violent resistance of Hans and Sophie Scholl, two leaders of the White Rose student group. However, resistance groups and those who were in moral or political opposition to the Nazis were stalled by the fear of reprisals from the Gestapo. Fearful of an internal overthrow, the forces of the Gestapo were unleashed on the opposition. Groups like the White Rose and others, such as the Edelweiss Pirates, and the Swing Youth, were placed under close Gestapo observation. Some participants were sent to concentration camps. Leading members of the most famous of these groups, the White Rose, were arrested by the police and turned over to the Gestapo. For several leaders the punishment was death. During the first five months of 1943, the Gestapo arrested thousands suspected of resistance activities and carried out numerous executions. Student opposition leaders were executed in late February, and a major opposition organisation, the Oster Circle, was destroyed in April 1943. Efforts to resist the Nazi regime amounted to very little and had only minor chances of success, particularly since a broad percentage of the German people did not support such actions.

General opposition and military conspiracy
Between 1934 and 1938, opponents of the Nazi regime and their fellow travellers began to emerge. Among the first to speak out were religious dissenters but following in their wake were educators, aristocratic businessmen, office workers, teachers, and others from nearly every walk of life. Most people quickly learned that open opposition was dangerous since Gestapo informants and agents were widespread. Yet a significant number of them still worked against the National Socialist government.

In May 1935, the Gestapo broke up and arrested members of the "Markwitz Circle", a group of former socialists in contact with Otto Strasser, who sought Hitler's downfall. From the mid-1930s into the early 1940s—various groups made up of communists, idealists, working-class people, and far-right conservative opposition organisations covertly fought against Hitler's government, and several of them fomented plots that included Hitler's assassination. This led to corresponding arrests, being sent to concentration camps and execution. One of the methods employed by the Gestapo to contend with these resistance factions was 'protective detention' which facilitated the process in expediting dissenters to concentration camps and against which there was no legal defence.

Early efforts to resist the Nazis with aid from abroad were hindered when the opposition's peace feelers to the Western Allies did not meet with success. This was partly because of the Venlo incident of 9 November 1939, in which SD and Gestapo agents, posing as anti-Nazis in the Netherlands, kidnapped two British Secret Intelligence Service (SIS) officers after having lured them to a meeting to discuss peace terms. This prompted Winston Churchill to ban any further contact with the German opposition. Later, the British and Americans did not want to deal with anti-Nazis because they were fearful that the Soviet Union would believe they were attempting to make deals behind their back.

The German opposition was in an unenviable position by the late spring and early summer of 1943. On one hand, it was next to impossible for them to overthrow Hitler and the party; on the other, the Allied demand for an unconditional surrender meant no opportunity for a compromise peace, which left the military and conservative aristocrats who opposed the regime no option (in their eyes) other than continuing the military struggle. Despite the fear of the Gestapo after mass arrests and executions in the spring, the opposition still plotted and planned. One of the more famous schemes, Operation Valkyrie, involved a number of senior German officers and was carried out by Colonel Claus Schenk Graf von Stauffenberg. In an attempt to assassinate Hitler, Stauffenberg planted a bomb underneath a conference table inside the Wolf's Lair field headquarters. Known as the 20 July plot, this assassination attempt failed and Hitler was only slightly injured. Reports indicate that the Gestapo was caught unaware of this plot as they did not have sufficient protections in place at the appropriate locations nor did they take any preventative steps. Stauffenberg and his group were shot on 21 July 1944; meanwhile, his fellow conspirators were rounded up by the Gestapo and sent to a concentration camp. Thereafter, there was a show trial overseen by Roland Freisler, followed by their execution.

Some Germans were convinced that it was their duty to apply all possible expedients to end the war as quickly as possible. The Gestapo cracked down ruthlessly on dissidents in Germany, just as they did everywhere else. Opposition became more difficult. Arrests, torture, and executions were common. Terror against "state enemies" had become a way of life to such a degree that the Gestapo's presence and methods were eventually normalised in the minds of people living in Nazi Germany.

Organisation
In January 1933, Hermann Göring, Hitler's minister without portfolio, was appointed the head of the Prussian Police and began filling the political and intelligence units of the Prussian Secret Police with Nazi Party members. A year after the organisation's inception, Göring wrote in a British publication about having created the organisation on his own initiative and how he was "chiefly responsible" for the elimination of the Marxist and Communist threat to Germany and Prussia. Describing the activities of the organisation, Göring boasted about the utter ruthlessness required for Germany's recovery, the establishment of concentration camps for that purpose, and even went on to claim that excesses were committed in the beginning, recounting how beatings took place here and there. Less than two weeks later in early May 1933, the Gestapo moved into their Berlin headquarters at Prinz-Albrecht-Straße 8.

The idea was to fully identify and integrate the party agency (SD) with the state agency (SiPo). Most SiPo members joined the SS and held a rank in both organisations. Nevertheless, in practice there was jurisdictional overlap and operational conflict between the SD and Gestapo.

In September 1939, the SiPo and SD were merged into the newly created  (RSHA; Reich Security Main Office). Both the Gestapo and Kripo became distinct departments within the RSHA. In lieu of naming convention changes, the original construct of the SiPo, Gestapo, and Kripo cannot be fully comprehended as "discrete entities", since they ultimately formed "a conglomerate in which each was wedded to each other and the SS through its Security Service, the SD".

The creation of the RSHA represented the formalisation, at the top level, of the relationship under which the SD served as the intelligence agency for the security police. A similar co-ordination existed in the local offices. Within Germany and areas which were incorporated within the Reich for the purpose of civil administration, local offices of the Gestapo, criminal police, and SD were formally separate. They were subject to co-ordination by inspectors of the security police and SD on the staffs of the local higher SS and police leaders, however, and one of the principal functions of the local SD units was to serve as the intelligence agency for the local Gestapo units. In the occupied territories, the formal relationship between local units of the Gestapo, criminal police, and SD was slightly closer.

The Gestapo became known as RSHA  ("Department or Office IV") with Heinrich Müller as its chief. In January 1943, Himmler appointed Ernst Kaltenbrunner RSHA chief; almost seven months after Heydrich had been assassinated.

Department A (Political Opponents)
Communists (A1)
Counter-sabotage (A2)
Reactionaries, liberals and opposition (A3)
Protective services (A4)
Department B (Sects and Churches)
Catholicism (B1)
Protestantism (B2)
Freemasons and other churches (B3)
Jewish affairs (B4)
Department C (Administration and Party Affairs), central administrative office of the Gestapo, responsible for card files of all personnel including all officials.
Files, card, indexes, information and administration (C1)
Protective custody (C2)
Press office (C3)
NSDAP matters (C4)
Protectorate affairs, Protectorate of Bohemia and Moravia, regions of Yugoslavia, Greece (D1)
1st Belgrade Special Combat detachment
General Government(D2)
Confidential office – hostile foreigners, emigrants (D3)
Occupied territories – France, Belgium, Holland, Norway, Denmark (D4)
Occupied Eastern territories (D5)
Department E (Security and counterintelligence)
Policy and economic formation (E2)
West (E3)
Scandinavia (North)(E4)
East (E5)
South (E6)

In 1941 , the central command office of the Gestapo was formed. However, these internal departments remained and the Gestapo continued to be a department under the RSHA umbrella.

In total, there were some fifty-four regional Gestapo offices across the German federal states. Personnel assigned to these auxiliary duties were often removed from the Gestapo chain of command and fell under the authority of branches of the SS. It was the Gestapo chief, SS-Brigadierführer Heinrich Müller, who kept Hitler abreast of the killing operations in the Soviet Union and who issued orders to the four  that their continual work in the east was to be "presented to the Führer."

Female Criminal Investigation Career
According to regulations issued by the Reich Security Main Office in 1940, women who had been trained in social work or having a similar education could be hired as female detectives.

Membership

In 1933, there was no purge of the German police forces. The vast majority of Gestapo officers came from the police forces of the Weimar Republic; members of the SS, the SA, and the NSDAP also joined the Gestapo but were less numerous. By March 1937, the Gestapo employed an estimated 6,500 people in fifty-four regional offices across the Reich. Additional staff were added in March 1938 consequent the annexation of Austria and again in October 1938 with the acquisition of the Sudetenland. In 1939, only 3,000 out of the total of 20,000 Gestapo men held SS ranks, and in most cases, these were honorary. One man who served in the Prussian Gestapo in 1933 recalled that most of his co-workers "were by no means Nazis. For the most part they were young professional civil service officers..." The Nazis valued police competence more than politics, so in general in 1933, almost all of the men who served in the various state police forces under the Weimar Republic stayed on in their jobs. In Würzburg, which is one of the few places in Germany where most of the Gestapo records survived, every member of the Gestapo was a career policeman or had a police background.

The Canadian historian Robert Gellately wrote that most Gestapo men were not Nazis, but at the same time were not opposed to the Nazi regime, which they were willing to serve, in whatever task they were called upon to perform. Over time, membership in the Gestapo included ideological training, particularly once Werner Best assumed a leading role for training in April 1936. Employing biological metaphors, Best emphasised a doctrine which encouraged members of the Gestapo to view themselves as 'doctors' to the 'national body' in the struggle against "pathogens" and "diseases"; among the implied sicknesses were "communists, Freemasons, and the churches—and above and behind all these stood the Jews". Heydrich thought along similar lines and advocated both defensive and offensive measures on the part of the Gestapo, so as to prevent any subversion or destruction of the National Socialist body.

Whether trained as police originally or not, Gestapo agents themselves were shaped by their socio-political environment. Historian George C. Browder contends that there was a four-part process (authorisation, bolstering, routinisation, and dehumanisation) in effect which legitimised the psycho-social atmosphere conditioning members of the Gestapo to radicalised violence. Browder also describes a sandwich effect, where from above; Gestapo agents were subjected to ideologically oriented racism and criminal biological theories; and from below, the Gestapo was transformed by SS personnel who did not have the proper police training, which showed in their propensity for unrestrained violence. This admixture certainly shaped the Gestapo's public image which they sought to maintain despite their increasing workload; an image which helped them identify and eliminate enemies of the Nazi state.

Population ratios, methods and effectiveness
Contrary to popular belief, the Gestapo was not the all-pervasive, omnipotent agency in German society. In Germany proper, many towns and cities had fewer than 50 official Gestapo personnel. For example, in 1939 Stettin and Frankfurt am Main only had a total of 41 Gestapo men combined. In Düsseldorf, the local Gestapo office of only 281 men were responsible for the entire Lower Rhine region, which comprised 4 million people. "V-men", as undercover Gestapo agents were known, were used to infiltrate Social Democratic Party of Germany (SPD) and Communist opposition groups, but this was more the exception than the rule. The Gestapo office in Saarbrücken had 50 full-term informers in 1939. The District Office in Nuremberg, which had the responsibility for all of northern Bavaria, employed a total of 80–100 full-term informers between 1943 and 1945. The majority of Gestapo informers were not full-term employees working undercover, but were rather ordinary citizens who chose to denounce other people to the Gestapo.

According to Canadian historian Robert Gellately's analysis of the local offices established, the Gestapo was—for the most part—made up of bureaucrats and clerical workers who depended upon denunciations by citizens for their information. Gellately argued that it was because of the widespread willingness of Germans to inform on each other to the Gestapo that Germany between 1933 and 1945 was a prime example of panopticism. The Gestapo—at times—was overwhelmed with denunciations and most of its time was spent sorting out the credible from the less credible denunciations. Many of the local offices were understaffed and overworked, struggling with the paper load caused by so many denunciations. Gellately has also suggested that the Gestapo was "a reactive organisation...constructed within German society and whose functioning was structurally dependent on the continuing co-operation of German citizens".

For information about what was happening in German society, the Gestapo continued to be mostly dependent upon denunciations. 80% of all Gestapo investigations were started in response to information provided by denunciations by ordinary Germans; while 10% were started in response to information provided by other branches of the German government and another 10% started in response to information that the Gestapo itself unearthed. The information supplied by denunciations often led the Gestapo in determining who was arrested.

The popular picture of the Gestapo with its spies everywhere terrorising German society has been rejected by many historians as a myth invented after the war as a cover for German society's widespread complicity in allowing the Gestapo to work. Work done by social historians such as Detlev Peukert, Robert Gellately, Reinhard Mann, Inge Marssolek, René Otto, Klaus-Michael Mallmann and Paul Gerhard, which by focusing on what the local offices were doing has shown the Gestapos almost total dependence on denunciations from ordinary Germans, and very much discredited the older "Big Brother" picture with the Gestapo having its eyes and ears everywhere.

An examination of 213 denunciations in Düsseldorf showed that 37% were motivated by personal conflicts, no motive could be established in 39%, and 24% were motivated by support for the Nazi regime. The Gestapo always showed a special interest in denunciations concerning sexual matters, especially cases concerning  with Jews or between Germans and foreigners, in particular Polish slave workers; the Gestapo applied even harsher methods to the foreign workers in the country, especially those from Poland, Jews, Catholics and homosexuals.  As time went by, anonymous denunciations to the Gestapo caused trouble to various NSDAP officials, who often found themselves being investigated by the Gestapo.

Of the political cases, 61 people were investigated for suspicion of belonging to the KPD, 44 for the SPD and 69 for other political parties. Most of the political investigations took place between 1933 and 1935 with the all-time high of 57 cases in 1935. After that year, political investigations declined with only 18 investigations in 1938, 13 in 1939, two in 1941, seven in 1942, four in 1943 and one in 1944. The "other" category associated with non-conformity included everything from a man who drew a caricature of Hitler to a Catholic teacher suspected of being lukewarm about teaching National Socialism in his classroom. The "administrative control" category concerned those who were breaking the law concerning residency in the city. The "conventional criminality" category concerned economic crimes such as money laundering, smuggling and homosexuality.

Normal methods of investigation included various forms of blackmail, threats and extortion to secure "confessions". Beyond that, sleep deprivation and various forms of harassment were used as investigative methods. Failing that, torture and planting evidence were common methods of resolving a case, especially if the case concerned someone Jewish. Brutality on the part of interrogators—often prompted by denunciations and followed with roundups—enabled the Gestapo to uncover numerous resistance networks; it also made them seem like they knew everything and could do anything they wanted.

While the total number of Gestapo officials was limited when contrasted against the represented populations, the average  (Nazi term for the "member of the German people") was typically not under observation, so the statistical ratio between Gestapo officials and inhabitants is "largely worthless and of little significance" according to some recent scholars. As historian Eric Johnson remarked, "The Nazi terror was selective terror", with its focus upon political opponents, ideological dissenters (clergy and religious organisations), career criminals, the Sinti and Roma population, handicapped persons, homosexuals and above all, upon the Jews. "Selective terror" by the Gestapo, as mentioned by Johnson, is also supported by historian Richard Evans who states that, "Violence and intimidation rarely touched the lives of most ordinary Germans. Denunciation was the exception, not the rule, as far as the behaviour of the vast majority of Germans was concerned." The involvement of ordinary Germans in denunciations also needs to be put into perspective so as not to exonerate the Gestapo. As Evans makes clear, "...it was not the ordinary German people who engaged in surveillance, it was the Gestapo; nothing happened until the Gestapo received a denunciation, and it was the Gestapo's active pursuit of deviance and dissent that was the only thing that gave denunciations meaning." The Gestapo's effectiveness remained in the ability to "project" omnipotence...they co-opted the assistance of the German population by using denunciations to their advantage; proving in the end a powerful, ruthless and effective organ of terror under the Nazi regime that was seemingly everywhere. Lastly, the Gestapo's effectiveness, while aided by denunciations and the watchful eye of ordinary Germans, was more the result of the co-ordination and co-operation amid the various police organs within Germany, the assistance of the SS, and the support provided by the various Nazi Party organisations; all of them together forming an organised persecution network.

Operations in Nazi-occupied territories
As an instrument of Nazi power, terror, and repression, the Gestapo operated throughout occupied Europe. Much like their affiliated organisations, the SS and the SD, the Gestapo "played a leading part" in enslaving and deporting workers from occupied territory, torturing and executing civilians, singling out and murdering Jews, and subjecting Allied prisoners of war to terrible treatment. To this end, the Gestapo was "a vital component both in Nazi repression and the Holocaust." Once the German armies advanced into enemy territory, they were accompanied by  staffed by officers from the Gestapo and Kripo, who usually operated in the rear areas to administer and police the occupied land. Whenever a region came fully under German military occupational jurisdiction, the Gestapo administered all executive actions under the military commander's authority, albeit operating relatively independent of it.

Occupation meant administration and policing, a duty assigned to the SS, the SD, and the Gestapo even before hostilities began, as was the case for Czechoslovakia. Correspondingly, Gestapo offices were established in a territory once occupied. Some locals aided the Gestapo, whether as professional police auxiliaries or in other duties. Nonetheless, operations performed either by German members of the Gestapo or auxiliaries from willing collaborators of other nationalities were inconsistent in both disposition and effectiveness. Varying degrees of pacification and police enforcement measures were necessary in each place, dependent on how cooperative or resistant the locals were to Nazi mandates and racial policies.

Throughout the Eastern territories, the Gestapo and other Nazi organisations co-opted the assistance of indigenous police units, nearly all of whom were uniformed and able to carry out drastic actions. While in many countries the Nazis occupied in the East, the local domestic police forces supplemented German operations, noted Holocaust historian, Raul Hilberg, asserts that "those of Poland were least involved in anti-Jewish actions." Nonetheless, German authorities ordered the mobilisation of reserve Polish police forces, known as the Blue Police, which strengthened the Nazi police presence and carried out numerous "police" functions; in some cases, its functionaries even identified and rounded up Jews or performed other unsavory duties on behalf of their German masters.

In places like Denmark, there were some 550 uniformed Danes in Copenhagen working with the Gestapo, patrolling and terrorising the local population at the behest of their German overseers, many of whom were arrested after the war. Other Danish civilians, like in many places across Europe, acted as Gestapo informants but this should not be seen as wholehearted support for the Nazi program, as motives for cooperation varied.

Nuremberg trials

Between 14 November 1945 and 3 October 1946, the Allies established an International Military Tribunal (IMT) to try 22 major Nazi war criminals and six groups for crimes against peace, war crimes and crimes against humanity. Nineteen of the 22 were convicted, and twelve—Martin Bormann (in absentia), Hans Frank, Wilhelm Frick, Hermann Göring, Alfred Jodl, Ernst Kaltenbrunner, Wilhelm Keitel, Joachim von Ribbentrop, Alfred Rosenberg, Fritz Sauckel, Arthur Seyss-Inquart, Julius Streicher—were given the death penalty. Three—Walther Funk, Rudolf Hess, Erich Raeder—received life terms; and the remaining four—Karl Dönitz, Konstantin von Neurath, Albert Speer, and Baldur von Schirach—received shorter prison sentences. Three others—Hans Fritzsche, Hjalmar Schacht, and Franz von Papen—were acquitted. At that time, the Gestapo was condemned as a criminal organisation, along with the SS. However, Gestapo leader Heinrich Müller was never tried, as he disappeared at the end of the war.

Leaders, organisers, investigators and accomplices participating in the formulation or execution of a common plan or conspiracy to commit the crimes specified were declared responsible for all acts performed by any persons in execution of such plan. The official positions of defendants as heads of state or holders of high government offices were not to free them from responsibility or mitigate their punishment; nor was the fact that a defendant acted pursuant to an order of a superior to excuse him from responsibility, although it might be considered by the IMT in mitigation of punishment.

At the trial of any individual member of any group or organisation, the IMT was authorised to declare (in connection with any act of which the individual was convicted) that the group or organisation to which he belonged was a criminal organisation. When a group or organisation was thus declared criminal, the competent national authority of any signatory had the right to bring persons to trial for membership in that organisation, with the criminal nature of the group or organisation assumed proved.

The IMT subsequently convicted three of the groups: the Nazi leadership corps, the SS (including the SD) and the Gestapo. Gestapo members Hermann Göring, Ernst Kaltenbrunner and Arthur Seyss-Inquart were individually convicted. While three groups were acquitted of collective war crimes charges, this did not relieve individual members of those groups from conviction and punishment under the denazification programme. Members of the three convicted groups, however, were subject to apprehension by Britain, the United States, the Soviet Union, and France.

Aftermath

In 1997, Cologne transformed the former regional Gestapo headquarters in Cologne—the EL-DE Haus—into a museum to document the Gestapo's actions.

After the war, U.S. Counterintelligence Corps employed the former Lyon Gestapo chief Klaus Barbie for his anti-communist efforts and also helped him escape to Bolivia.

Leadership

Principal agents and officers

Heinrich Baab (SiPo-SD Frankfurt)
Klaus Barbie (SiPo-SD Lyon)
Werner Best (SiPo-SD Copenhagen)
Karl Bömelburg (Head of Gestapo, Southern France)
Theodor Dannecker (SiPo-SD Paris)
Rudolf Diels (Gestapo Chief 1933–1934)
Adolf Eichmann (RSHA Berlin)
Gerhard Flesch
Hermann Göring (Founder of the Gestapo)
Viktor Harnischfeger (Düsseldorf Gestapo Criminal Commissar)
Reinhard Heydrich (SD, SiPo, Gestapo Chief 1934–1939, RSHA Chief 1939–1942)
Heinrich Himmler
Ernst Kaltenbrunner (RSHA Chief 1943–1945)
Herbert Kappler (SD Chief Rome)
Werner Knab
Helmut Knochen (Paris)
Kurt Lischka (Paris)
Ernst Misselwitz ( SiPo-SD Paris)
Heinrich Müller (Gestapo Chief 1939–1945)
Karl Oberg (Paris)
Pierre Paoli (Head of Gestapo, Central France)
Oswald Poche (Chief of Frankfurt Lindenstrasse station)
Henry Rinnan (Norwegian agent)
Karl Eberhard Schöngarth
Max Wielen

Ranks and uniforms
The Gestapo was a secretive plainclothes agency and agents typically wore civilian suits. There were strict protocols protecting the identity of Gestapo field personnel. When asked for identification, an operative was required only to present his warrant disc and not a picture identification. This disc identified the operative as a member of the Gestapo without revealing personal information, except when ordered to do so by an authorised official.

Leitstellung (district office) staff did wear the grey SS service uniform, but with police-pattern shoulderboards, and SS rank insignia on the left collar patch. The right collar patch was black without the sig runes. The SD sleeve diamond (SD ) insignia was worn on the lower left sleeve, even by SiPo men who were not in the SD.

The Gestapo maintained police detective ranks which were used for all officers, both those who were and who were not concurrently SS members.

Junior career = .
Senior career = .
Sources:

Rank insignia

See also
Geheime Feldpolizei

Informational notes

Citations

Bibliography

Bauz, Ingrid; Sigrid Brüggemann; Roland Maier, eds. (2013). Die Geheime Staatspolizei in Württemberg und Hohenzollern. Stuttgart: Schmetterling. .

 

Krausnick, Helmut, et al. (1968). Anatomy of the SS State. New York; Walker and Company.

External links

Festung Furulund – magasinet – Dagbladet.no 
Collection of testimonies concerning Gestapo activity in occupied Poland during WWII in "Chronicles of Terror" database

Gestapo
1933 establishments in Germany
1945 disestablishments in Germany
Heinrich Himmler
Hermann Göring
The Holocaust
Nazi SS
Reich Security Main Office
Reinhard Heydrich
Secret police